Dude Wipes are a disposable wipe product manufactured by Dude Products, a personal care brand based in Chicago. Dude Wipes was launched in 2012 and received the 2013 Visionary Award at the Vision 2013 Consumer Products Conference.

History
Dude Wipes were invented by founders and childhood friends Sean Riley, Brian Wilkin, Ryan Meegan, and Jeff Klimkowski from their apartment in Chicago, Illinois in 2010. It was marketed as a flushable personal wipe specifically for men, as an alternative to traditional baby wipes.

The product became available to consumers in retail stores and online in 2012, and are now available in Kroger, Target, Meijer, Ralphs, and Bass Pro Shops nationwide.

In 2015, the founders of Dude Products appeared on ABC reality television program Shark Tank, and secured a $300,000 investment from Dallas Mavericks owner Mark Cuban for a 25% stake in the company.

In 2018, Dude Products were selected by Walmart for nationwide distribution as part of their Made in the USA program, which pledges to source $250 billion in US-made products by 2023.

Promotion

During UFC 174, Dude Wipes trended worldwide on Twitter after sponsoring fighter Tyron Woodley, with their logo appearing on his trunks. Dude Products also sponsored UFC fighter Justine Kish after she lost control of her bowels in the ring during a choke hold.

In 2015, Dude Wipes were featured on an episode of Rob Dyrdek's Fantasy Factory.

In 2016, signs for Dude Wipes appeared numerous times during Fox's broadcast of the 2016 World Series at Wrigley Field as part of a guerrilla marketing campaign.

After Arizona Diamondbacks pitcher Archie Bradley revealed in an interview that he had a bowel accident while pitching during a game, Dude Products sent him a shipment of Dude Wipes, which Bradley shared on social media and subsequently went viral.

Dude Wipes in 2018 began sponsoring Matt DiBenedetto and the 32 Go Fas Racing team in the NASCAR Cup Series beginning at Pocono in July.

In October 2018, Dude Wipes struck an endorsement deal with New York Jets running back Isaiah Crowell after Crowell celebrated a touchdown against the Cleveland Browns by pretending to wipe his behind with the football.

Dude Wipes would sponsor Anthony Alfredo and the 21 Richard Childress Racing team in the NASCAR Xfinity Series in 2020 beginning at Talladega Superspeedway in April.

Dude Wipes would sponsor Anthony Alfredo and the 38 Front Row Motorsports team in the NASCAR Cup Series in 2021 beginning at Homestead-Miami Speedway in February. 

Dude Wipes would sponsor Anthony Alfredo and the 23 Our Motorsports team in the NASCAR Xfinity Series in 2022 beginning at Daytona International Speedway in February.

References

Further reading

 Inquisitr
 Heavy
 Daily Dot
 Men's Health
 The Blast
 American Inno
 BBC

External links 
 Dude Products

Paper products
American brands